Sierra Leone National First Division is the second highest football league in Sierra Leone, after the Sierra Leone National Premier League. Along with the Sierra Leone National Premier League, they are the two major football leagues in Sierra Leone. The league is controlled by the Sierra Leone Football Association.

Format
The 14 clubs that make up the National First Division play each other twice during the season, once at home and once away. At the end of the season, the top two clubs from the National First Division are promoted to the Sierra Leone National Premiere League, while the bottom two clubs  are relegated to the Sierra Leone second division.

2007/2008 teams

External links
 SLFA Division One 2021 - The Rec.Sport.Soccer Statistics Foundation.
 http://www.rsssf.com/tabless/sier07.html

2002 establishments in Sierra Leone
Football leagues in Sierra Leone
Sports leagues established in 2002